Neetha Ashok is an Indian actress known for her works in Kannada-language films & television and has also worked in Hindi television. She made her feature film debut with the Tulu film Jabardasth Shankara (2019) before gaining recognition with Vikrant Rona (2022).

Early life 
She was born in a Kota Brahmin Family (Herle) in coastal region village called Kota Village from Udupi District, Karnataka which is near to Kundapura Town, and lived in Delhi, Mangaluru and Bengaluru. Her father is Ashok Herle, a banker and mother is Geetha Ashok Herle. She calls herself the great-granddaughter of Shivaram Karanth.

Career 
Neetha Ashok starred in three Kannada television serials including Yashodhe, Naa Ninna Bidalaare, and Neelambari as the lead as well as a Hindi serial on Doordarshan. She made her feature film debut with the Tulu film Jabardasth Shankara starring her school senior Arjun Kapikad directed by Devadas Kapikad. She made her Kannada film debut with Vikrant Rona (2022) after she met Sudeep at a Colors Kannada party.

Filmography

Films

Television

References

External links 
 
 

21st-century Indian actresses
Living people
Indian film actresses
Indian television actresses
People from Udupi district
1991 births